Thaumeledone is a genus of octopuses in the family Octopodidae found in deep waters in the Southern Hemisphere.

Characteristics
Members of this genus are found in deep waters in the Southern Hemisphere. They are small, squat-bodied, benthic octopuses with arms united by a web. A single row of suckers occurs on the arms. Most species have a deep purple pigmentation on the oral surface of the web. One arm in the male is modified into a hectocotylus. This has a large calamus at the end, giving it a club-like appearance.

Species
These species are accepted by the World Register of Marine Species:
 Thaumeledone brevis (Hoyle, 1885) - southwest Atlantic Ocean
 Thaumeledone gunteri Robson, 1930 - Southern Ocean around South Georgia
 Thaumeledone marshalli O'Shea, 1999 - New Zealand and the southwest Pacific Ocean
 Thaumeledone peninsulae Allcock, Collins, Piatkowski & Vecchione, 2004 - Southern Ocean, Antarctic Peninsula
 Thaumeledone rotunda (Hoyle, 1885) - Southern Ocean and circumpolar (This name is considered invalid by the World Register of Marine Species, which prefers Bentheledone rotunda.)
 Thaumeledone zeiss O'Shea, 1999 - New Zealand and the southwest Pacific Ocean

References

External links

 

Octopodidae